This list of space artists includes artists who produce art about space and spaceflight, such as paintings of proposed space missions.

Artists
Charles Bittinger
Chesley Bonestell (1888–1986)
Howard Russell Butler
Paul Calle (1929–2010)
Chris Calle (1929–2010)
Michael Carroll
Jack Coggins
Vincent Di Fate (born 1945)
Don Davis (born 1952)
Joe Davis (born 1950)
Don Dixon (born 1951)
Bob Eggleton (born 1960)
Danny Flynn
David A. Hardy (born 1936)
Joby Harris (born 1975)
William K. Hartmann (born 1939)
Kirthi Jayakumar
Jon Lomberg (born 1948)
Robert McCall (Bob McCall) (1919–2010)
Syd Mead (1933–2019)
Ron Miller (born 1947)
Theophile Moreux
Nahum (born 1979)
Andreas Nottebohm (born 1944)
Ludek Pesek (1919–1999)
Frank Pietronigro
Pat Rawlings (born 1955)
Lucien Rudaux (1874–1947)
Adolf Schaller
John Schoenherr
Alex Schomburg
Yuri Pavlovich Shvets (1902–1972)
Rick Sternbach (born 1951)
Étienne Léopold Trouvelot

Astronaut space artists
Alan Bean
Alexei Leonov
Sian Proctor
Nicole Stott

See also
 List of space art related books

References

External links
Mostly Lunar Exploration space art (NASA)
Mostly Mars Exploration space art (NASA)
Space Art Exhibition 2015

Artists
 
Space